Monguno is one of the LGAs  Local Government Area of Borno State in northeastern Nigeria.

Landscape 

Monguno has a total landscape area of 1,913 km

Population 
Monguno has a population of 109,851 at the 2006 census.

Postal Code 
The postal code of the area is 612.

History 
It is one of the sixteen LGAs that constitute the Borno Emirate, a traditional state located in Borno State, Nigeria.

Insurgency 
In early January 2015, residents fled Monguno and the village of Doron-Baga for the internally displaced persons camps in Maiduguri, following the capture of nearby Bama by Boko Haram. Monguno was captured by Boko Haram forces on 26 January 2015. Amnesty International expressed concern that local residents' requests for more troops for protection from Boko Haram had been ignored by the Army. On 17 February 2015, the military retook Monguno in a coordinated air and ground assault. Boko Haram and ISWAP carried out bombings in June and September 2015 and a massacre in June 2020.

References

Local Government Areas in Borno State
Populated places in Borno State